SPANX family member N1 is a protein that in humans is encoded by the SPANXN1 gene.

Function

This gene represents one of several duplicated family members that are located on chromosome X. This gene family encodes proteins that play a role in spermiogenesis. These proteins represent a specific subgroup of cancer/testis-associated antigens, and they may be candidates for tumor vaccines. This family member belongs to a subgroup of related genes that are present in all primates and rats and mice, and thus, it represents one of the ancestral family members.

References

Further reading